Return to Peyton Place is an American daytime serial which aired on NBC from April 3, 1972  to January 4, 1974. The series was a spin-off of the prime time drama series Peyton Place rather than an adaptation of the 1959 novel of the same name by Grace Metalious.

The storylines from the daytime show were a continuation of those from the prime time series. Both James Lipton and Gail Kobe worked as writers on the series during its run. Frank Ferguson (as Eli Carson), Evelyn Scott (Ada Jacks), and Patricia Morrow (Rita Jacks Harrington) reprised their roles from the earlier series.

Selena Cross, a major character in the original novel and the films both it and its sequel inspired, had not been included in the prime time TV series because her storyline was considered too risque at the time. She was a featured character in the daytime soap.

Plot

Benny/Jason Tate
The original main focuses of the show were Betty Anderson, Rodney Harrington, Constance MacKenzie, Elliot Carson, Allison MacKenzie, and Leslie Harrington. In the beginning, Michael Rossi was revealed not to be guilty for the murder he was on trial for at the end of Peyton Place. Allison returned to town following an absence of three years, during which time she had seen life. A mysterious figure, Benny Tate, follows her and they marry. Benny, however, was suffering from a terminal disease and told his brother Jason about this, explaining he could no longer be with Allison. Instead of helping his brother, Jason followed Benny to town and took Benny's identity. Unlike Benny, Jason was very tough and treated Allison very badly. The constant beating led Allison to a drug addiction, which she eventually kicked. Nevertheless, she retained her vulnerability. She started working for the town newspaper and was involved in an ecology project.

One day, Allison decided she had had enough and tried to run from Jason, who she still thought was Benny. He decided to take revenge by kidnapping her, taking Allison to a cabin by the lake. There, Allison took LSD, and during a psychedelic experience, she took Elliot's gun and shot at Benny. Afterwards, she escaped from the cabin and looked for help nearby. Sometime later, she found out the cabin was burned down, with a body still inside. Allison admitted she shot Benny and was charged with second degree murder.

To avoid Allison being sentenced, Rodney went back to the village where the cabin was situated. He met Benny and Jason's mother Zoe, who knew that Allison had actually been living with Jason, but thought that Allison was aware of this. Benny eventually confessed to the murder of his brother, explaining he found out about Jason's scheme shortly after Allison's arrival at the cabin. He traveled to the cabin to confront his brother, and following a fight, shot Jason to death. Shortly after admitting the truth, Benny died from his disease and Allison was released from prison.

Connie/Michael/Selena love triangle

By the time Allison was still serving a prison sentence, Elliot wanted to confess to the murder so his daughter would be released from prison. However, Connie would not let her husband do so, thereby creating a wedge between them. Elliot became very unloving to his wife and he started an affair with D. B. Bentley. D. B. turned out using Elliot in favor of her company and lost interest in him when she achieved her goal. Elliot and Connie were estranged from each other and Elliot temporarily left town, with Connie staying behind.

A July 1973 article reported that Selena was about to marry Michael. In late 1973, Michael and Selena married each other. The night before Michael and Selena married, Michael spent the night with Connie. Selena confronted Connie with this rumor, which was actually the truth, and following a heated argument, Selena pushed Connie off the stairs, causing Connie to be hospitalized. Connie later covered for Selena, not wanting to ruin her reputation. Connie later turned out to be pregnant and told Michael he was the father. Partly because the baby was injured during Connie's fall, they agreed to a secret abortion. Shortly after this incident, Elliot returned from Paris to Peyton Place and expressed his interest in a reconciliation. Despite Connie and Matthew's issues with abandonment, Elliot was eventually welcomed back into his home.

Meanwhile, Michael still was in love with Connie and told her he was willing to divorce Selena to marry her. Selena realized her husband was in love with Connie and tried to distract his attention to her by planning a vacation. However, Michael made up tons of excuses not to leave town. Realizing her son is in desperate need of attention from Elliot, Connie told Michael they could never be together. Afterwards, Michael and Selena left town for St. Croix.

Life on the wharf
In mid-1973, Rita took over her mother Ada's bar near the wharf and hired student waitress Monica Bell, with whom she soon started competing. Rita was jealous of Monica, who was able to combine her studies with being a waitress. Rita started spending most of her time at the bar, turning it into a nightspot which appealed to students. This was much to Norman's upset, who felt he was becoming estranged from his wife.

A sub-plot involved Tom Dana, a mysterious doctor. He admitted to Monica he accidentally caused a car accident a year earlier, which injured and later killed his girlfriend Ellen, who was D. B.'s cousin. He was accused of having killed Ellen, because he put her in such a position after the accident, which prohibited her from breathing. A trial followed, during which Tom was charged with murder, the motive being not wanting to become a father, considering Ellen was pregnant at the time. He was found guilty of manslaughter but the medical board soon acquitted him. Monica tried to help him land a job at the local hospital, but Dr. Rossi and Allison were reluctant to hire him, because of the news reports on his past. This angered Monica, who felt they should have believed in Tom's innocence. Monica eventually went out to investigate the incident herself and proved Tom's innocence. With his name finally cleared, Tom was able to focus on his personal life and he planned on marrying Monica.

In the end of the series, Rita became pregnant and, although she was diagnosed with anemia, gave birth to a healthy boy. Norman feared the health of his wife and was overjoyed with happiness following the labor.

Betty/Rodney/Steven love triangle
Meanwhile, Betty was still married to Rodney, but they grew estranged from each other. This was much to the anger of Martin Peyton, Rodney's very powerful grandfather who staged his own death a few years earlier. Only few people were aware of Martin Peyton's situation, including Betty and Hannah. Betty has had a son, Peyton, by Steven, but refused to let him see him. She let everyone believe that Peyton was Rodney's son and when Steven found out about this, he threatened to reveal the true parentage of Peyton. Hannah discouraged her son from doing so, explaining Peyton would lose the family fortune if it turned out he was not Rodney's son. By keeping quiet, Steven was allowed to scheme Rodney out of his company so he could take over, thereby becoming the leader of Martin Peyton's company.

Rodney and Betty eventually divorced so Rodney could marry Allison, who had accepted his proposal. Rodney had accepted his inheritance only to have money to bail out Allison, who was at this time still in jail for Benny Tate's murder. In the meantime, Betty fell in love with Steven, which was boosted by his recently acquired power and wealth. Steven and Betty planned on marrying each other, which worried D. B. Bentley, who thought the quick marriage could hurt Steven's career. Despite Betty's claim that D. B. was only discouraging Steven from the marriage because she wanted him for herself, Steven followed D. B.'s advice. D. B. indeed attempted to seduce Steven, but Steven noticed D. B. was only doing this to use him for her company, and pretended to fall for her to use her for his company instead. Steven was also occupied ruining Rodney's career most of the time.

Near the end of the series, D. B. was still trying to break up Steven and Betty. Steven realized he could lose Betty if he continued on meeting D. B. and broke contact. He and Betty wanted to leave for the Caribbean to marry. This gladdened Rodney and Allison, who felt they could not plan a wedding until Steven and Betty left. However, before all of this could happen, Martin Peyton announced he was finally returning to town to prohibit the marriages from taking place. With this announcement, the soap opera ended its run.

Cast

Original cast
Bettye Ackerman (April 3 - November 1972) and Susan Brown (November 18, 1972 – January 4, 1974) as Constance MacKenzie Carson
The mother of Allison MacKenzie and Matthew Carson, and wife of Elliot Carson. She owns the town bookstore.
Warren Stevens as Elliot Carson (April 3, 1972 – January 4, 1974 – entire run)
Husband of Constance, father of Matthew and Allison. He spent 18 years in prison for the murder of his first wife, but was later acquitted. He is publisher and editor of the Peyton Place Clarion.
Katherine Glass (April 3, 1972 – 1973) and Pamela Susan Shoop (1973 – January 4, 1974) as Allison MacKenzie Tate
Illegitimate daughter of Elliot and Constance. Upon learning from her mother who her real father was, she ran way and returned to Peyton Place after three years.
Frank Ferguson as Eli Carson (April 3, 1972 – January 4, 1974 – entire run)
Father of Elliot. He owns and runs the town's general store and gives warm and fatherly advice to everyone.
Lawrence P. Casey (April 3 - May 1972) and Yale Summers (June 8, 1972 – January 4, 1974) as Rodney Harrington
Married to Betty Anderson for the second time, he inherited the Martin Peyton fortune, but refused to accept it. He and his brother, Norman, own two fishing boats.
Julie Parrish (April 3, 1972 – December 1973) and Lynn Loring (December 1973 – January 4, 1974) as Betty Anderson Harrington
Wife of Rodney, once married to Steven Cord. She is unhappy with the simple life, and she and Rodney recently separated.
Ron Russell as Norman Harrington (April 3, 1972 – January 4, 1974 – entire run)
Brother of Rodney, husband of Rita Jacks. They have a three-year-old daughter, Laurie.
Patricia Morrow as Rita Jacks Harrington (April 3, 1972 – January 4, 1974 – entire run)
Wife of Norman, mother of Laurie. She lives to please her husband and is always by his side. She takes over her mother Ada's bar.
Stacy Harris (April 3, 1972 – March 1973) and Frank Maxwell (March 28, 1973 - January 1974) as Leslie Harrington
Father of Norman and Rodney. He was once powerful and wealthy. He has alienated from his sons, but hopes by persuading Rodney to accept his inheritance, he will gain power again.
Evelyn Scott as Ada Jacks (April 3, 1972 – June 1973)
Mother of Rita. She owns Ada Jacks' Tavern, by the waterfront.
Guy Stockwell as Dr. Michael Rossi (April 3, 1972 – January 4, 1974 – entire run)
The town doctor and confidante who has been involved with several women.
Joseph Gallison as Steven Cord (April 3, 1972 – January 4, 1974 – entire run)
The illegitimate son of Martin Peyton's daughter. He was raised as the son of Hannah Cord. Once married to Betty, he is now a lawyer for the Peyton estate.
Mary K. Wells as Hannah Cord (April 3, 1972 – January 4, 1974 – entire run)
One time mistress and housekeeper for Martin Peyton, she raised Steven Cord as her own son.

Additional cast
John Levin as Matthew Carson (April 24, 1972 – January 4, 1974)
Three-year-old son of Constance and Elliot Carson.
Ben Andrews as Benny/Jason Tate (April 25, 1972 – 1973)
Benny is a mysterious, menacing figure from Allison's three-year disappearance, who claims to be her husband. Jason is his villainous brother.
John Hoyt as Martin Peyton (May 1972 – January 4, 1974)
The powerful and intimidating grandfather of Rodney and Norman Harrington and Steven Cord. Presumed dead in the original series, it turns out he has staged his own death.
Alex Nicol as Dr. Wells (1972 – 1973)
Chuck Daniel as Ed Ryker (1972 – 1973
Margaret Mason as Selena Cross Rossi (November 18, 1972 – January 4, 1974)
A young woman with a troubled past, she marries Michael Rossi.
Dino Fantini as Gino Panzini (November 1972 - April 1973)
A friend of Benny Tate.
Betty Ann Carr as Monica Bell (May 1973 – January 4, 1974) 
A college student who starts working at Ada's Tavern, now owned by Rita. Rita soon grows jealous of Monica's charm.
James Doohan as Mr. Blake (Summer 1973)

Mary Frann as D. B. Bentley (1973 – January 4, 1974)
The chief executive of an international oil complex, D. B. uses her looks and sex appeal for her own favor. During her stay in Peyton Place, she charmed several men, including Elliot and Steven.
Rudy Solari as Bob Whitmore (1973)
A young man who is in love with Allison. This love, however, remains unanswered.
Charles Sailor as Tom Dana (1973 – January 4, 1974)
A mysterious doctor who previously caused a car accident, killing his girlfriend Ellen. He was charged with murder, but he was soon released from prison.
Mary Jackson as Nell Abernathy (1973-1974)

Production
When the daytime soap opera went into production, the crew tried to prevent a failure by limiting the regular cast members to 15. According to the actors, the original Peyton Place eventually failed due to the large number of actors working on the show, which confused the viewers. On March 28, 1972, it was announced in a highly publicized media report that the soap opera was slated to air. Thousands of actors tested for the role. Following a long search, Kathy Glass was cast as Allison MacKenzie. The show's writer, James Lipton, commented on the casting that Glass was "one of the most gifted actors I've ever worked with. She has incredible flexibility; there's almost nothing she can't do. She has an emotional suppleness you encounter very rarely in an actress of any age. And to find this in an actress is like finding a treasure." Glass asked to be released from her contract in March 1973 and she was replaced by Pamela Susan Shoop, who made her first appearance on March 13, 1973.

Patricia Morrow, who also appeared on the first TV series, initially declined the role, saying she could not combine working five days a week on the show with law school. However, she accepted a contract of two working days a week and she motivated her return by saying: "I really can't turn down money. I have to use what earning power I have right now. Actress Julie Parrish, who was named by the media as one of the most promising actresses of the soap, recalled working on the show was very tough, and she admitted she had a breakdown one day on the set. In August 1972, Gail Kobe signed on as the executive producer of the show. On November 18, 1972, Susan Brown replaced Ackerman as Constance MacKenzie, and Margaret Mason first appeared as Selena Cross. Mary Frann and Charles Sailor joined the cast in June 1973, even though Frann already made her first appearance on May 18, 1973.

In early January 1974, the show was cancelled due to poor ratings. Actor Ron Russell, who portrayed Norman Harrington, claimed this was due to the slow plot changes of the show, calling the soap opera "the slowest-moving daytime drama in history." It was a couple of months before the demise of the show that the writers allowed the plot to move at a pace that would hold the interest of the general viewer. According to the loyal viewers, the show would have been able to become more popular had it been on the air for a few weeks extra.

Prime time special
On Sunday, January 21, 1973, the show aired in prime time for one episode designed to recap details of a murder mystery regarding Benny Tate being investigated in the daytime version. This was the first time a daytime soap opera aired a special episode in prime time. It aired after a new episode of Columbo.

Broadcast history/ratings
see List of U.S. daytime soap opera ratings

Return to Peyton Place replaced Bright Promise on NBC's schedule at 3:30 PM/2:30 Central. While the series performed much better than its predecessor against ABC's One Life to Live or CBS's The Edge of Night, after a strong start, it landed third ratings-wise in the time slot. In July 1973, CBS debuted its Match Game '73 in the 3:30 slot, which soon became daytime's top-rated program. In response, NBC pulled Return to Peyton Place on January 4 in favor of How to Survive a Marriage, which proved to be less successful and was cancelled 15 months later.

1971-1972 Season
1. As The World Turns 11.1
2. General Hospital 10.4
3. Days Of Our Lives 9.9
11. Return to Peyton Place 7.4 (Debut)
13. One Life To Live 7.3
16. Bright Promise 6.1

1972-1973 Season
1. As The World Turns 10.6
2. Days Of Our Lives 9.9
3. Another World 9.7
7. One Life To Live 8.3 
13. Return to Peyton Place 7.2

1973-1974 Season
1. As The World Turns 9.7
1. Days Of Our Lives 9.7
1. Another World 9.7
4. The Doctors 9.5
8. One Life To Live 7.8
11. Return to Peyton Place 7.0

References

External links
 

1972 American television series debuts
1974 American television series endings
American television soap operas
American television spin-offs
Return to Peyton Place
NBC original programming